Highway 904 is a provincial highway in the north-west region of the Canadian province of Saskatchewan. It travels from the Highway 4 / Highway 224 in the Meadow Lake Provincial Park to north boundary of park at the edge of the Cold Lake Air Weapons Range. It intersects Highway 951 within the park.

Highway 904 was once Highway 104, a northerly extension of Highway 4; it was replaced in the early 1980s.

See also 
Roads in Saskatchewan
Transportation in Saskatchewan

References 

904